The Northern Boyacá Province is a province of the Colombian Department of Boyacá. The province is formed by 9 municipalities.

Municipalities 
Boavita • Covarachía • La Uvita • San Mateo • Sativanorte • Sativasur • Soatá • Susacón • Tipacoque

References 

Provinces of Boyacá Department